Loyola University is one of several Jesuit Universities named for St. Ignatius of Loyola.

Loyola University may refer to:

Democratic Republic of the Congo
Loyola University of Congo, Kinshasa, Congo

Spain
Loyola University Andalusia, Sevilla

United States
Loyola Marymount University, Los Angeles, California
Loyola Law School
Loyola University Chicago, Illinois
Loyola University Chicago School of Law
Loyola University Medical Center
Loyola University Maryland, Baltimore, Maryland 
Loyola University New Orleans, Louisiana
Loyola University New Orleans College of Law

See also